This article details the Bradford Bulls rugby league football club's 2003 season, the 8th season of the Super League era.

Season review

February 2003

The season started off well for the Bulls as they beat Warrington Wolves 38–12 in the 4th Round of the Challenge Cup. Bradford's start to the league campaign was shocking as they were hammered 46–22 by the 2002 champions St Helens R.F.C.

March 2003

Bradford continued their run in the Challenge Cup with an 82–0 victory over lower league Hunslet Hawks with Lesley Vainikolo grabbing a hat-trick. The Bulls got their 1st win of their league campaign with a hard fought 22–10 win against Wakefield Trinity Wildcats. Bradford progressed to the semi-finals of the Challenge Cup by beating Widnes Vikings 38–28 in the quarter-final. The Bulls got their first back to back wins of the season with an outstanding 62–22 victory against Halifax Blue Sox, both James Lowes and Robbie Paul both grabbed hat-tricks. Bradford finished the month off with a hard fought 26–18 win against Widnes Vikings.

April 2003

The Bulls continued their run of form by opening April with a comfortable 32–8 win over Warrington Wolves. Bradford progressed to the Challenge Cup Final as they beat Wigan Warriors 36–22 in the semi-final. The Bulls great league form continued with a 48–24 win over Hull FC. Bradford's month came to a spectacular end as they beat rivals Leeds Rhinos 22–20 to win the Challenge Cup. Tries from Robbie Paul, Jamie Peacock and Tevita Vaikona helped the Bulls win their 2nd Challenge Cup in the Super League era.

May 2003

The Bulls followed their Challenge Cup win with a hard fought 14–8 win against Wigan Warriors. The Bulls good form continued with a hard fought 30–10 win against Castleford Tigers which was made even harder when Leon Pryce was sent off. Bradford recorded a huge win as they beat Huddersfield Giants 52–6 with Robbie Paul scoring a hat-trick. The Bulls finished May with an impressive 48–22 win against arch rivals Leeds Rhinos.

June 2003

Bradford started June with an unfortunate 22–12 loss to London Broncos with Dennis Moran tearing the Bulls apart and scoring a hat-trick. The Bulls got back to winning ways as they edged out Hull F.C. to win the game 26–20. Bradford once again came away with the 2 points as they beat Warrington Wolves 24–20. The Bulls came crashing back to earth as Wigan Warriors beat them 35–22. Bradford then were demolished 35–0 by St Helens R.F.C. at the end of the month.

July 2003

The Bulls started July with a 30–18 win against Wakefield Trinity Wildcats to get the Bulls back to winning ways. Bradford backed this win up with a 60–12 victory over Halifax Blue Sox. The Bulls continued their fine form with a 40–8 win against Widnes Vikings. The streak continued with a 40–20 win over Castleford Tigers and then a 60–6 win against London Broncos where Leon Pryce scored 4 tries.

August 2003

Bradford continued their form into August as they beat Huddersfield Giants 30–16 and then followed this up by beating Leeds Rhinos 18–16 at Headingley Stadium. The Bulls also beat Hull F.C. 36–22 in the middle of the month before losing 26–12 to Wigan Warriors. Bradford bounced back and hammered London Broncos 54–12 with Paul Deacon becoming the highest point scorer for the Bulls in the Super League era as he booted over his 400th goal for the club.

September 2003

Bradford started September with a very narrow 22–21 win against arch rivals Leeds Rhinos, the Bulls won thanks to 2 drop goals from scum-half Paul Deacon. In the run up to the end of the season Bradford lost 28–14 to Castleford Tigers. The Bulls finished the regular rounds with a 22–18 win over St Helens R.F.C. which meant that Bradford finished top of the league ahead of Leeds Rhinos.

October 2003

The Bulls beat arch rivals Leeds Rhinos 30–14 in the Qualifying Semi-final to reach the 2003 Grand Final, in the process Paul Deacon became the first person to score 1,000 points for the Bradford Bulls in the Super League era. A couple of weeks later the Bulls would once again face Wigan Warriors in a Grand Final, the Bradford side won 25–12 after Shontayne Hape, Stuart Reardon and James Lowes (in his last game for the Bulls) all scored tries whilst Paul Deacon kicked 6 goals and a drop goal to make the Bulls Super League champions for a 3rd time.

2003 milestones

CCR4: Shontayne Hape scored his 1st try for the Bulls.
CCR4: Leon Pryce scored his 50th try and reached 200 points for the Bulls.
CCR5: Lesley Vainikolo scored his 1st hat-trick for the Bulls.
CCR5: Karl Pratt and Rob Parker scored their 1st tries for the Bulls.
Round 2: Lee Radford kicked his 1st goal for the Bulls.
Round 3: James Lowes scored his 1st hat-trick for the Bulls.
Round 3: Robbie Paul scored his 7th hat-trick for the Bulls.
Round 3: Stuart Reardon scored his 1st try for the Bulls.
Round 3: Paul Deacon reached 700 points for the Bulls.
CCSF: Paul Deacon kicked his 300th goal for the Bulls.
Round 10: Robbie Paul scored his 8th hat-trick for the Bulls.
Round 10: Paul Deacon reached 800 points for the Bulls.
Round 11: Daniel Gartner scored his 25th try and reached 100 points for the Bulls.
Round 15: Robbie Paul scored his 125th try and reached 500 points for the Bulls.
Round 18: Lesley Vainikolo scored his 25th try and reached 100 points for the Bulls.
Round 20: Paul Deacon reached 900 points for the Bulls.
Round 7: Leon Pryce scored his 1st four-try haul and 2nd hat-trick for the Bulls.
Round 7: Jamie Langley scored his 1st try for the Bulls.
Round 23: Lesley Vainikolo scored his 2nd hat-trick for the Bulls.
Round 25: James Lowes reached 400 points for the Bulls.
Round 25: Paul Deacon kicked his 400th goal for the Bulls.
Qualifying Semi-final: Paul Deacon reached 1,000 points for the Bulls.

Table

2003 Fixtures and results

2003 Tetley's Super League

Challenge Cup

Playoffs

2003 squad statistics

 Appearances and Points include (Super League, Challenge Cup and Play-offs) as of 2012.

References

External links
Bradford Bulls Website
Bradford Bulls in T&A
Bradford Bulls on Sky Sports
Bradford on Super League Site
Red, Black And Amber
BBC Sport-Rugby League 

Bradford Bulls seasons
Bradford Bulls